Yardena Samuels or Samuels-Lev is an Israeli molecular biologist who is the Director of the Ekard Institute for Cancer Diagnosis Research at the Weizmann Institute of Science. Her research considers the genetic mutations of melanoma.

Early life and education 
Samuels was born in Tel HaShomer. She first visited the Weizmann Institute of Science at the age of seventeen, when she attended a summer school at the international summer science institute. Her mother is a diplomat and her father is a Director for International Relations. She was an undergraduate student at University of Cambridge, where she earned a Bachelor's degree in 1993. Samuels moved to the Hebrew University of Jerusalem, where she worked toward an MSc in immunology. She returned to the United Kingdom for graduate studies in molecular cancer biology, during which she was based at the Ludwig Institute for Cancer Research. She moved to Johns Hopkins University as a postdoctoral fellow in Bert Vogelstein's laboratory in 2003. She identified that the gene encoding PI3-Kalpha is mutated in one third of colorectal cancer patients. During this position, she became interested in personalised medicine for cancer treatment.

Research and career 
In 2006, Samuels was appointed Assistant Professor at the Cancer Genetics Branch of the National Human Genome Research Institute at the National Institutes of Health. She established a tumour bank of almost 120 normal and tumour tissue samples. The bank allowed her to analyse for mutations in melanomas, as well as offering hope for the identification of new drug targets. She returned to Israel as a researcher in 2012, where she established her own laboratory at the Weizmann Institute of Science. She was made Director of the Weizmann Brazil Tumor Bank. The bank helps scientists identify genes that are associated with tumour growth.

Samuels' research involves the use of DNA sequencing to identify genetic mutations in melanoma. She identified a mutation that is present in one in five of melanoma cases.

Awards and honours 
 Elected to the Council of the European Molecular Biology Organization
 European Research Council award
 Alfred Blalock, Young Investigators' Day Award
 Genome Technology’s Top 25 Young Investigators
 Elected Fellow of the European Academy of Cancer Sciences

Selected publications

Personal life 
Samuels is married to Ori Lev and has two sons.

References 

Molecular biologists
Israeli biologists
Year of birth missing (living people)
Hebrew University of Jerusalem alumni
Alumni of Imperial College London
National Institutes of Health faculty
Academic staff of Weizmann Institute of Science
Living people